The 2006 Grand Prix de Denain was the 48th edition of the Grand Prix de Denain cycle race and was held on 13 April 2006. The race was won by Jimmy Casper.

General classification

References

2006
2006 in road cycling
2006 in French sport